Gornovka is a rural locality (a settlement) in Ivanovsky Selsoviet, Kuryinsky District, Altai Krai, Russia. The population was 168 as of 2013. There are 4 streets.

Geography 
Gornovka is located on the Milovanovka River, 25 km southwest of Kurya (the district's administrative centre) by road. Ivanovka is the nearest rural locality.

References 

Rural localities in Kuryinsky District